Lake Tengrela is a small lake near Banfora in Burkina Faso.  It is known for its hippopotamuses.  Locals believe that these hippopotamuses do not attack humans because they are sacred hippopotamuses.  Crocodiles are almost never seen in this lake. It is 2 km long and 1.5 km wide.

References

Lakes of Burkina Faso
Ramsar sites in Burkina Faso